Embrace of the Vampire is a 2013 erotic horror direct-to-video film directed by Carl Bessai and written by Andrew C. Erin, Alan Mruvka, and Sheldon Roper. It is a loose remake of the 1995 film of the same name. The film was released on video in the United States on October 15, 2013.

Plot
The virgin and repressed Charlotte Hawthorn joins the university from a Catholic school with a scholarship for participating in the fencing team. She shares the room with Nicole and tells her that her mother died and she is alone. Charlotte has thalassemia and is forced to use medicine. She gets a job working as a waitress in a coffee shop owned by Chris. Soon she meets the fencing coach, Professor Cole, who is also responsible for the literature classes, and her mate Eliza becomes jealous over his treatment of Charlotte. Soon she has daydreams and the mystic Daciana, who is the owner of a store, explains her fate in the world as a vampire hunter, but Charlotte does not believe in her until her friends die.
She begins having erotic and gruesome dreams.

Cast

Reception
The film has a critic aggregate score of 10% on Rotten Tomatoes. DVD Talk said, "If you're into gory lesbian vampire movies with lots of female nudity, you'll enjoy this. It offers all of that, wraps up it with a serviceable plot line and some style, and delivers exactly what you expect it to, no more, no less." Bloody Disgusting said the film "is a loose remake of the original, but while the 1995 film had melodramatic allure, this one is painfully boring. It would’ve benefited greatly from introducing Charlotte’s slaying family tradition earlier in the movie, rather than its final minutes. Ultimately, it’s an easily forgettable remake." PopMatters in its review said, "Certainly Embrace of the Vampire isn’t nearly as bad as it could have been, but it’s hardly an evening at the ballet, either."

References

External links

2013 direct-to-video films
Direct-to-video erotic films
Direct-to-video horror films
LGBT-related horror films
Canadian vampire films
Horror film remakes
Remakes of American films
Films shot in British Columbia
Canadian erotic films
English-language Canadian films
CineTel Films films
Films about nightmares
Erotic horror films
2013 LGBT-related films
2013 films
Films set in Los Angeles
2010s English-language films
2010s Canadian films